William Tchamba (born June 11, 1984 in Lille,  France) is a French sprint canoer who has competed since the late 2000s. He won a bronze medal in the C-1 4 × 200 m event at the 2009 ICF Canoe Sprint World Championships in Dartmouth.

At the 2008 Summer Olympics in Beijing, Tchamaba was eliminated in the semifinals of both the C-2 500 m and the C-2 1000 m events.

References
Canoe09.ca profile
Sports-Reference.com profile

1984 births
Canoeists at the 2008 Summer Olympics
French male canoeists
Sportspeople from Lille
Living people
Olympic canoeists of France
ICF Canoe Sprint World Championships medalists in Canadian